Cydia ergoda is a moth of the family Tortricidae. It is found in Nigeria.

The wingspan is about 16 mm. The ground colour of the forewings is brownish, but cream towards the base and browner in the terminal area where creamer spots and blackish scales are found. The dorsobasal and postmedian areas are dotted white and the markings are brownish and rudimentary. The hindwings are brown.

Etymology
The species name refers to the somewhat ambiguous systematic position of the species and is derived from Greek ergodes (meaning difficult).

References

Moths described in 2013
Grapholitini
Moths of Africa